Gypsy Melody is a 1936 British musical comedy film directed by Edmond T. Gréville and starring Lupe Vélez, Alfred Rode and Jerry Verno. It was made at Elstree Studios. The sets were designed by art director John Mead.

The film was a remake of the 1935 French film Juanita.

Synopsis
Due to a complex series of events a Guards Officer in a small European country is imprisoned. He manages to escape in the company of an idiotic milliner and they briefly take shelter with some gypsies, where the Captain falls in love with a young woman. Having been discovered by an American promoter while performing with gypsy orchestra in a tavern, the three accompany him to London as the latest new musical sensation. A great success, they begin a European-wide tour when their plane is forced down by bad weather in their homeland. Here events are satisfactorily resolved.

Cast
 Lupe Vélez as Mila 
 Alfred Rode as Captain Eric Danilo 
 Jerry Verno as Madame Beatrice 
 Raymond Lovell as Court Chamberlain 
 Margaret Yarde as Grand Duchess 
 Fred Duprez as Herbert P. Melon 
 Hector Abbas as Biergarten Manager 
 Louis Darnley as Hotel Manager 
 G. De Joncourt as Doctor Ipstein 
 Monti DeLyle as Marco 
 Wyn Weaver as Grand Duke

References

Bibliography
 Low, Rachael. Filmmaking in 1930s Britain. George Allen & Unwin, 1985.
 Wood, Linda. British Films, 1927-1939. British Film Institute, 1986.

External links

1936 films
British musical comedy films
British black-and-white films
1936 musical comedy films
Films directed by Edmond T. Gréville
Films shot at British International Pictures Studios
British remakes of French films
1930s English-language films
1930s British films